Stella K. Hershan (1915–2014) was an Austrian-American novelist and biographer who immigrated to the United States in 1939 as a refugee from the Holocaust. Among her published works are two about Eleanor Roosevelt: A Woman of Quality and The Candles She Lit: The Legacy of Eleanor Roosevelt.

Hershan, born in Vienna, was the daughter of Felix Kreidl, a businessman, and Lucy Pick Kreidl.  She married Rudolph Hershan, an engineer, in 1933. She graduated from New York University with a certificate in general education in 1962 and from the New School for Social Research with a certificate in human relations in 1968.

The Hershans had one child, a daughter, Lisa. Preceded in death by her husband, Hershan died in 2014 in New York City.

Bibliography

Biography
 A Woman of Quality,  (1970)
 The Candles She Lit: The Legacy of Eleanor Roosevelt (1993)
 Emigration, Emigration : Exilgeschichten (in German) (2004)
 Erinnerungen Zwischen Zwei Welten : Exilerzählungen = Memories Between Two Worlds (in German) (2006)

Novels
 The Naked Angel : A Novel about the Times of Metternich and Napoleon (1973)
 The Maiden of Kosovo (2003)
 In Freundschaft, Elisabeth : Roman (in German) (1992)
 ''Ein Kind der Revolution: Roman" (in German) (1992)

Hershan also contributed to journals in the United States and Austria.

References

1915 births
2014 deaths
20th-century American women writers
Writers from Vienna
Writers from Manhattan
21st-century American women writers
New York University alumni
The New School alumni
20th-century Austrian women writers
21st-century Austrian women writers
Austrian emigrants to the United States